The 2015 Northern NSW Football season was the second season under the new competition format in northern New South Wales.  The competition consisted of six divisions across the district. The overall premier for the new structure qualified for the National Premier Leagues finals series, competing with the other state federation champions in a final knockout tournament to decide the National Premier Leagues Champion for 2015.

League Tables

2015 National Premier League Northern NSW

The 2015 National Premier League Northern NSW season was played over 18 rounds. The bottom team was relegated to the 2016 Northern NSW State League Division 1. Promoted for 2015 are Maitland FC, who were previously in the top tier of Northern NSW football in 2002. In a change for 2015, the top four teams in the league will contest the semi-finals, which will be conducted over two legs.

Finals

Top Scorers

2015 Northern NSW State League Division 1

The 2015 Northern NSW State League Division 1 season is the second season of the new Northern NSW State League Division 1 as the second level domestic association football competition in the district of Northern NSW. 11 teams will compete, all playing each other twice, for a total of 20 rounds. The top team at the end of the year is promoted to the 2016 National Premier Leagues Northern NSW, subject to meeting criteria.

Finals

2015 Zone Premier League

The 2015 Zone Premier League season is the second edition of the Newcastle Zone Premier League as the third level domestic football competition in the district of Northern NSW. 10 teams will compete, all playing each other twice for a total of 18 rounds.

Finals

2015 Zone League 1

The 2015 Zone League 1 season is the second edition of the Zone League 1 as the fourth level domestic football competition in the district of Northern NSW. 10 teams will compete, all playing each other twice for a total of 18 matches.

Finals

2015 Zone League 2

The 2015 Zone League 2 season is the second edition of the Zone League 2 as the fifth level domestic football competition in the district of Northern NSW. 10 teams will compete, all playing each other twice for a total of 18 matches.

Finals

2015 Zone League 3

The 2015 Zone League 3 season is the second edition of the Zone League 3 as the sixth level domestic football competition in the district of Northern NSW. 10 teams will compete, all playing each other twice for a total of 18 matches.

Finals

2015 Women's Premier League

The highest tier domestic football competition in Northern NSW for women was known for sponsorship reasons as the Herald Women's Premier League. The 8 teams played a triple round-robin for a total of 18 games, followed by a finals series.

Cup Competitions

FFA Cup Preliminary rounds

Northern NSW soccer clubs competed in 2015 within the Northern NSW Preliminary rounds for the 2015 FFA Cup. In addition to the A-League club Newcastle Jets, the two Round 7 winners - Broadmeadow Magic and Edgeworth FC - qualified for the final rounds of the 2015 FFA Cup, entering at the Round of 32, where they were both eliminated.

References

Northern NSW Football